King Midas' Ears (Turkish: Midas'ın Kulakları) is an opera in two acts, a satirical work by Ferit Tüzün who composed it from 1966 to 1969. It premiered at State Opera in Istanbul in 1969.

The opera is based on part of the myth of Midas.

Roles

Midas, baritone
Barber, speaking role
Apollon, bass
Pan, tenor

References

External links
Review by Brian Felsen, 25 October 1998

Operas
1969 operas
Turkish-language operas
Operas based on classical mythology